The 1890 Navy Midshipmen football team represented the United States Naval Academy during the 1890 college football season. The team compiled a 5–1–1 record and outscored its opponents 204 to 49. The season featured the inaugural meeting in the Army–Navy Game, which ended in a 24–0 victory for Navy. After the victory, Navy cadets in Annapolis "fired twenty-four great guns, and then paraded the streets with horns."  Charles Emrich was the Navy team captain in 1890.

Schedule

References

Navy
Navy Midshipmen football seasons
Navy Midshipmen football